Bogdanów may refer to the following places in Poland:
Bogdanów, Lower Silesian Voivodeship (south-west Poland)
Bogdanów, Łódź Voivodeship (central Poland)
Bogdanów, Lesser Poland Voivodeship (south Poland)
Bogdanów, Greater Poland Voivodeship (west-central Poland)
Bogdanów, Opole Voivodeship (south-west Poland)

Wolfgang Bogdanow, fictional character in Sense8